Reference Signal Received Power (RSRP) is a measure of the received power level in an LTE cell network.  The average power is a measure of the power received from a single reference signal.

See also
Received signal strength indication
Signal strength in telecommunications

References

Mobile technology